Rüdiger Leo Urbanke (born 1966) is an Austrian computer scientist and professor at the Ecole polytechnique fédérale de Lausanne (EPFL).

Life 

Urbanke studied at the Technical University of Vienna with the diploma as an electrical engineer in 1988 and at the Washington University in St. Louis with the master's degree in 1992 and his doctorate in 1995. He then worked at Bell Laboratories.

Career 

From 2000 to 2004 he was an Associate Editor of the IEEE Transactions on Information Theory. From 2009 till 2012 he was the head of the I&C Doctoral School and in 2013 he served as a Dean of I&C.

Distinctions 

Urbanke is a co-recipient of the 2002 and the 2013 IEEE Information Theory Society Best Paper Award, a recipient of the 2011 
IEEE Koji Kobayashi Computers and Communications Award, the 2014 IEEE Richard W. Hamming Medal and the 2023 Claude E. Shannon Award. 
He was selected as an IEEE Distinguished lecturer by the Information theory society for 2013-2014

and received a STOC Best Paper Award in 2016.

Bibliography

References

External links
 

Austrian computer scientists
Washington University in St. Louis alumni
1966 births
Living people